Al-Sanamayn District is a district (mantiqah) in Daraa Governorate, Syria. According to the census of 2004, it had 167,993 inhabitants. Its administrative center is the village of Duma in the settlement Al-Sanamayn.

Sub-districts
The district of Al-Sanamayn is divided into three sub-districts or Nāḥiyas (population according to 2004 official census):
Al-Sanamayn Subdistrict (ناحية الصنمين): population 113,316.
Al-Masmiyah Subdistrict (ناحية المسمية) :population 8,773.
Ghabaghib Subdistrict (ناحية غباغب): population 45,793.

References

 
Districts of Daraa Governorate